The 2015 GoDaddy Bowl was a post-season American college football bowl game held on January 4, 2015, at Ladd–Peebles Stadium in Mobile, Alabama in the United States.  The sixteenth edition of the GoDaddy Bowl, it featured the Toledo Rockets of the Mid-American Conference against the Arkansas State Red Wolves of the Sun Belt Conference. The game began at 8:00 p.m. CST and aired on ESPN.  It was one of the 2014–15 bowl games that concluded the 2014 FBS football season.  The game was sponsored by web hosting service company GoDaddy.

Team selection
The game featured the Toledo Rockets of the Mid-American Conference against the Arkansas State Red Wolves of the Sun Belt Conference.

It was the third overall meeting between these two teams, with Toledo leading the series 2–0 prior to the kickoff. The last time these two teams met was in 1992.

Toledo Rockets

After the Rockets finished the regular season with an 8–4 record, they accepted their invitation to play in the game.

This was Toledo's second GoDaddy Bowl; the Rockets previously won the 2005 game (when it was known as the GMAC Bowl) over the UTEP Miners, 45–13.

Arkansas State Red Wolves

After the Red Wolves finished the regular season with a 7–5 record, bowl director Jerry Silverstein extended an invitation to play in the game.

This was the Red Wolves' fourth GoDaddy Bowl, extending their record for most appearances in the game.  The Red Wolves had a 2–1 record in the GoDaddy Bowl prior to this match-up, losing the 2012 game to the Northern Illinois Huskies, 38–20, winning the 2013 game over the Kent State Golden Flashes, 17–13, and winning the 2014 game over the Ball State Cardinals, 23–20.

Game summary

Scoring summary

Source:

Statistics

References

External links
 ESPN summary

GoDaddy Bowl
LendingTree Bowl
Arkansas State Red Wolves football bowl games
Toledo Rockets football bowl games
January 2015 sports events in the United States
GoDaddy Bowl